Clubmoor is a Liverpool City Council Ward in the Liverpool Walton Parliamentary constituency. The population of this ward at the 2011 census was 15,272. The ward boundary was changed at the 2004 municipal elections.

Councillors
The ward returned 7 councillors. By-elections were called following the resignation of Cllr James Noakes in 2019 and the death of Cllr Tim Jeeves, who had successfully defended his seat in the May elections on 9 September 2021.

Sarah Morton was suspended by the Labour Party in April 2021 following a series of outbursts on social media, and resigned from the Labour Party to sit as an independent in November 2021.

 indicates seat up for re-election after boundary changes.

 indicates seat up for re-election.

 indicates change in affiliation.

 indicates seat up for re-election after casual vacancy.

Election results

Elections of the 2020s

Elections of the 2010s

Elections of the 2000s

After the boundary change of 2004 the whole of Liverpool City Council faced election. Three Councillors were returned.

• italics denotes the sitting Councillor
• bold denotes the winning candidate

References

External links
Ward Profile

Wards of Liverpool